CS Progym Gheorgheni is an ice hockey team from Gheorgheni, Romania. They play their home games at Gyergyószentmiklósi Műjégpálya.

History
The club was founded in 1949, and have played in the Romanian Hockey League ever since. In 2008, they joined the MOL Liga alongside the Steaua Rangers. However, they only played one season in the MOL Liga, before dropping out.

External links
Official website

Ice hockey teams in Romania
Panonian League teams
Erste Liga (ice hockey) teams
Gheorgheni
Ice hockey clubs established in 1949
1949 establishments in Romania
Sport in Harghita County